Carlos Larrañaga Ladrón de Guevara (11 March 1937 – 30 August 2012) was a Spanish actor.

Biography

Personal life
Larrañaga was born in Barcelona to actress María Fernanda Ladrón de Guevara, and was the half-brother of actress Amparo Rivelles. He was the father of Amparo Larrañaga, Pedro Larrañaga and Luis Merlo, all actors, and the father-in-law of actress Maribel Verdú.

Career
His film debut was in 1941, at age four, in Alma de Dios, directed by  Ignacio F. Iquino. His first success was in 1950 with  Pequeñeces, directed by Juan de Orduña.  He had a major supporting role in The Pride and the Passion with Cary Grant, Frank Sinatra and Sophia Loren and then starred in Ha llegado un ángel and El extraño viaje, among other films. His most remembered role is in the TV series  Farmacia de guardia (1991–1995) directed by Antonio Mercero.

Death
Carlos Larrañaga died on 30 August 2012 at age 75 in Málaga.

Selected filmography

 Heart of Gold (1941) - Niño de Ezequiela
 Serenata española (1947) - Isaac Albéniz (niño)
 Cita con mi viejo corazón (1950)
 Pequeñeces (1950) - Paquito
 The Adventures of Gil Blas (1956) - Le Prince
 The Pride and the Passion (1957) - Jose
 Classe di ferro (1957)
 La puerta abierta (1957) - Pedro
 ...Y eligió el infierno (1957)
 15 bajo la lona (1959) - Fernando Fresneda
 Parque de Madrid (1959)
 Un vaso de whisky (1959) - Carlos Aranda
 A sangre fría (1959) - Carlos
 The Little Colonel (1960) - Teniente Eduardo Aranda
 El traje de oro (1960) - Quique
 Peaches in Syrup (1960) - Carlos
 La moglie di mio marito (1961) - Baldassarre
 Siega verde (1961) - Enric Pujalt
 Ha llegado un ángel (1961) - Javier
 Siempre es domingo (1961) - Luis Lara
 La alternativa (1963)
 El extraño viaje (1964) - Fernando
 De cuerpo presente (1967) - Nelson
 Escuela de enfermeras (1968) - Dr. Ramón Terán
 Las amigas (1969) - Príncipe
 Casa Flora (1973) - Ramón
 Los pájaros de Baden-Baden (1975) - Ricardo
 Las verdes praderas (1979) - Ricardo González de Sotillo
 Los locos vecinos del 2º (1980) - Julio
 Gay Club (1981) - Gobernador civil
 127 millones libres de impuestos (1981) - Manolo
 Adolescencia (1982) - Antonio
 Y del seguro... líbranos Señor! (1983) - Ramiro
 Redondela (1987) - Arturo Méndez
 Pesadilla para un rico (1996) - Álvaro
 Atraco a las 3... y media (2003) - Otto
 Tiovivo c. 1950 (2004) - Marcelino
 Escuela de seducción (2004)
 Bienvenido a casa (2006) - Andrés
 The Last Gateway (2007) - Sheriff McOwen
 Luz de domingo (2007) - Atila
 Sangre de Mayo (2008) - Isidoro Máiquez
 Malditos sean! (2011) - (segment "Alimenta la caja")
 Los muertos no se tocan, nene (2011) - Doctor Salamoya (final film role)

References

External links

1937 births
2012 deaths
Spanish male television actors
Spanish male film actors
Male actors from Barcelona
20th-century Spanish male actors
21st-century Spanish male actors